Kayoze Irani is an Indian actor and film director. He is the son of actor Boman Irani.

Education 
Kayoze completed his BA - Film, Television & New Media Production (BAFTNMP) degree from Kishinchand Chellaram College (KC College), Bombay. He still remains an active member in the workings of the media dept. of KCC.

Career
He has directed the Netflix release Ajeeb Daastaans and is known for his performance in his debut film Student Of The Year.

Filmography

References 

Living people
Male actors in Hindi cinema
Irani people
1987 births

External links